Seetu Kohli  is an Indian architect known for  creating interior designs and representing  luxury brands of furniture in India and Qatar. She is the founder and CEO of Seetu Kohli Home, an Indian-based furniture company.

Early life and education
She was born in Jammu India. She graduated as an architect from Sushant School of Art and Architecture in Gurgaon.

Career
Kohli started her company with her husband but later branched out on her own. She has designed and executed homes in hotels, offices, malls including Westin gurgaon, Westin resorts Haryana, and others.

She worked with DLF, Vatika, Ambience, and other home designers. She designed and furnished an Armani Casa townhouse for the  Mshreib complex in Qatar. Later, she became the furniture supplier to  private Yachts and homes across some locations. She was a partner in Gauri Khan Designs and was instrumental in launching the Gauri Khan Designs showroom in Mumbai.  She has supplied furniture to many Bollywood homes including Shahrukh Khan’s Mannat, Salman Khan’s Home at Galaxy apartments, Ranbir Kapoor, Karan Johar and Kangana Ranaut.

Kohli  launched a home line with designer Manish Malhotra. She also launched a made in India brand for furniture and accessories called Mallika's Edit.

Kohli is a co-chair for the core committee for luxury and lifestyle by CII in India. She was on the jury of Luxury Lifestyle Awards held in Singapore. She was announced as one of the 3 formidable women displaying at the AD show in Mumbai in 2018 by Vogue magazine in India. She has been featured in various magazines and is widely recognised for her work and her journey as a global women entrepreneur.

References

External links
 

Living people
Indian interior designers
Indian architects
Year of birth missing (living people)